Alexandru Ene (also known as Alexandru Ene I; 19 September 1928 – 22 May 2011) was a Romanian football striker.

Club career
Alexandru Ene was born on 19 September 1928 in Brăila, Romania and he started playing football at junior level at Olympia București from 1941 to 1947, then he went to play Metalul București at senior level in Divizia B, helping the team promote to Divizia A where he made his debut under coach Augustin Botescu on 22 August 1948 in a 6–1 loss against CFR Timișoara. He was transferred at Dinamo București in 1951 where he spent 8 seasons, being loaned in 1953 at Dinamo Brașov, afterwards returning to Dinamo where in the 1954 Divizia A season he became the top-scorer of the league with 20 goals, in the following season he helped the club win the first Divizia A title in its history, being used by coach Angelo Niculescu in 23 matches in which he scored 14 goals, being the top-scorer of the team. He also won the 1958–59 Cupa României and played in the first European match of a Romanian team in the 1956–57 European Cup in the 3–1 victory against Galatasaray in which he scored the last goal, helping The Red Dogs go to the next phase of the competition where they were eliminated by CDNA Sofia, Ene playing in all four games from the campaign. On 19 June 1960 Ene played his last Divizia A match for Dinamo in a 3–1 loss against Farul Constanța, having a total of 179 matches in which he scored 105 goals in the competition. After retiring, he worked in leading positions in football, including being vice-president of Dinamo from 1971 until 1973. Alexandru Ene died on 22 May 2011 at age 82.

International career
Alexandru Ene played 10 games in which he scored 5 goals at international level for Romania, making his debut under coach Gheorghe Popescu I on 28 June 1953 in a 3–1 home victory against Bulgaria at the 1954 World Cup qualifiers in which he scored one goal. He made another two appearances at the 1954 World Cup qualifiers and another two in which he scored two goals against Greece and Yugoslavia at the 1958 World Cup qualifiers. Ene made his last appearance for the national team on 14 September 1958 in a friendly which ended with a 3–2 away loss against East Germany in which he scored one goal.

International goals
Scores and results list Romania's goal tally first. "Score" column indicates the score after each Alexandru Ene goal.

Honours

Club
Metalul București
Divizia B: 1947–48
Dinamo București
Divizia A: 1955
Cupa României: 1958–59

Individual
Divizia A top scorer: 1954

Notes

References

External links
 
 
 

1928 births
2011 deaths
Sportspeople from Brăila
Romanian footballers
Olympic footballers of Romania
Romania international footballers
Liga I players
Liga II players
Faur București players
FC Dinamo București players
Unirea Tricolor București players
Association football forwards